Baileyville is a census-designated place in the southern portion of Ferguson Township, Centre County, Pennsylvania. As of the 2010 census, the population was 201 residents.

It is in the valley of Spruce Creek, a southwest-flowing tributary of the Little Juniata River.

Demographics

References

Census-designated places in Centre County, Pennsylvania
Census-designated places in Pennsylvania